Intermodal transport (or intermodal transportation) involves the use of more than one mode of transport for a journey. It may refer to:

 Intermodal passenger transport
 Intermodal freight transport

See also
 Intermodal transportation center

fr:Intermodalité
pl:Transport intermodalny